Tetracha annuligera is a species of tiger beetle that was described by Hippolyte Lucas in 1857. The species can be found in Brazil, Bolivia, Argentina, and Peru.

References

Cicindelidae
Beetles described in 1857
Beetles of South America